Nancy L. VanderMeer (born 1958) is an American businesswoman and politician from the Town of Greenfield, in Monroe County, Wisconsin, currently serving in the Wisconsin State Assembly.

Public office 
VanderMeer is a Republican. She ran in the 2012 election for Assembly district 70, winning the Republican primary in August, but losing to the Democratic incumbent, Amy Sue Vruwink, in the November general election. In 2014, VanderMeer was again the Republican nominee, and defeated Vruwink in the 70th district race.

Personal life 
VanderMeer received her bachelor's degree from University of Wisconsin–La Crosse and now owns her family's business, VanderMeer Motor Company. 
VanderMeer and her husband of over 20 years, David Hall, live on a dairy farm which has been in Hall's family for five generations. She is active in the local Lutheran Church.

References

1958 births
Living people
People from Monroe County, Wisconsin
University of Wisconsin–La Crosse alumni
Businesspeople from Wisconsin
Women state legislators in Wisconsin
Republican Party members of the Wisconsin State Assembly
21st-century American politicians
21st-century American women politicians